Ghulam Abbas (born 19 March 1966, Harrappa) is a Pakistani former hurdler who competed in the 1992 Summer Olympics and the 1991 World Championships in Athletics. He was also the 1990 Asian Games 400 metres hurdles champion.

References

1966 births
Living people
People from Sahiwal District
Pakistani male hurdlers
Olympic athletes of Pakistan
Athletes (track and field) at the 1992 Summer Olympics
Asian Games gold medalists for Pakistan
Asian Games medalists in athletics (track and field)
Athletes (track and field) at the 1990 Asian Games
World Athletics Championships athletes for Pakistan
Medalists at the 1990 Asian Games
20th-century Pakistani people